Brad Laner (born November 6, 1966 in Los Angeles, California)  is an American musician and record producer best known for his work with the shoegaze band Medicine, which he founded and led.

Prior to Medicine, he was involved in avant-improv bands such as Debt of Nature (at the age of 15), Steaming Coils (at the age of 18)—which also featured members of Los Angeles Free Music Society—and most notably the experimental tribal post-punk outfit Savage Republic, which, according to Pitchfork Media, foreshadowed many ideas later explored in the post-rock genre.

He has also been active as a solo artist, recording under the moniker Electric Company as well as releasing numerous albums under his own name.

His work has been sampled by artists such as Brian Eno (Eno extensively sampled Electric Company's songs on several tracks from Another Day on Earth), and Caribou. He has collaborated with, among many others, M83 on its 2011 album Hurry Up, We're Dreaming.

Career

Laner founded his first band, Debt of Nature, at the age of 15 (in 1981). He then continued his musical endeavours with Steaming Coils, an experimental avant-rock band that he also founded in 1984. It released two full-length albums before disbanding in 1989, but its last record was released two years after the break-up.

In the meantime, Laner joined Savage Republic as a percussionist and a keyboard player, and took part in recording two of its albums.

In 1990 he founded shoegaze-noise pop band called Medicine, in which he applied a do-it-yourself ethos to create his signature sound by running his guitar through a 4-track recorder. In 1992 Medicine released its debut album, Shot Forth Self Living. In 1994 the band contributed one track to the soundtrack of the movie The Crow and appeared in the movie itself. The band ceased to exist in 1995, briefly reuniting in 2003 as a duo (with Laner and Shannon Lee).

In 1995 he started his solo project Electric Company, which was devoted to IDM, glitch, and avant-garde electronics with some elements of ambient and drone. As Electric Company, he released ten full-length albums in nine years (before ceasing activity in 2004). The same year, he also founded psychedelic supergroup Lusk with the members of Tool and Failure, with whom he released one album, Free Mars. It received a Grammy Award nomination.

In 1996, he collaborated (under his own name) with Dallas-based musical collective Vas Deferens Organization on the album Transcontinental Conspiracy. Laner co-wrote and co-produced the album; several Mercury Rev members were also involved in the recording and producing process. They collaborated again in 1999, this time under his Electric Company moniker, on the album More Pelvis Wick for the Baloney Boners.

In 2007, Laner released his first album under his own name, Neighbor Singing, with the input of Thom Monahan. He then followed it up in 2010 with his second solo release, Natural Selections.

Discography

with Debt of Nature 
 Order: Spoil The Entire State (Harbinger Sound 2013)

cassette releases
 Pets Have Fears Too (Real Big Dog tapes 1981)
 Robin Diamond's Lungs (A.R.P.H. tapes 1982)
 Idiot Stick (Party Sound Tapes 1983)
 Pets Have Fears Two (Party Sound Tapes 1983)
 Food Music (Gleet Audio 1983)
 1981 Vol. 1 (Jookie Thrills 1983)
 Debt of Nature (Goodall Tapes 1986)
 Order: Spoil The Entire State (VHS) (Goodall Tapes 1986)
 "San Salvador Day" (Goodall Tapes 2014)
 "Salt Meadows" (Lal Lal Lal 2015)
 "Come Flying" (Goodall Tapes 2015)
 "Spring Training" (Goodall Tapes 2015)
 "Small Silver Car" (Lal Lal Lal 2015)
 "The Helix Of Repair" (Lal Lal Lal 2016)

compilation appearances
 Feeble Efforts (New Alliance 1981)
 Mighty Feeble (New Alliance 1982)
 Life is Boring So Why Not Steal This Record (New Underground 1983)
 L.A. Mantra (Trance Port Tapes 1983)
 Live at the Trance Port (Trance Port Tapes 1983)
 Phantom Takes (Trance Port Tapes 1983)
 Give Me That Dog Penis Popsicle (Gleet Audio 1983)
 Sex and Bestiality (DF Sadist School 1984)
 Perpetual State of Oracular Dream (Anomalous 1991)
 "L'Incoronazione" (Hyster Tapes 2015)

with Earth Dies Burning 
 Songs From The Valley of the Bored Teenager 1981-84 (Captured Tracks 2013)

with Stahlbau 

cassette releases

 Todlich Verungluckt (A.R.P.H. tapes 1982)
 Die Macht Der Reichen (Aeon 1983)

with Pilgrim State 

 Effective Spiritual Warfare (New Underground, 1984)

with Severed Head In A Bag 

cassette releases

 "Live" (Goodall Tapes 2014)
 "Delayed Implantation" (Goodall Tapes 2014)

with Steaming Coils 
 Never Creak (Rotary Totem 1986)
 The Tarkington Table (Motiv 1987)
 Breaded (Nate Starkman & Sons CD 1991; reissued Quaquaversal Vinyl 1994; re-reissued Medical Records with bonus "Unfinished 1989" 7" E.P. 2016)
 Never Were (Tarkington Table cassette 1987)
 Studio Cassette (Medical Records 2016)

compilation appearances

 Bad Alchemy #9  (No Man's Land 1987)
 LAFMS-The Lowest Form of Music Box Set  (Cortical 1997)
 LAFMS-Unboxed (Cortical 1997)
note: the song "Blathering Hemispheres" from the "Never Creak" LP appears on both of the above LAFMS comps credited solely to Rick Potts

with To Nije Sala 
 A Bitter Kermit Haven (split Lp with What Makes Donna Twirl) (Ralph 1990)

with Savage Republic 
 Jamahiriya Democratique et Populaire de Sauvage (Fundamental 1988)
 Viva La Rock and Roll 7" (IPR 1988)
 Customs (Fundamental 1989)
 Live in Europe 1988 (Nate Starkman & Sons 1989)
 Box Set (Mobilization 2002)
 Procession: An Aural History (LTM 2010)

other 1980s releases as Brad Laner 

cassette releases

 SEP/8363 vols 1-5  (Party Sound Tapes 1982-1984)
 Blind Force (Goodall Tapes 1985)

compilation appearances

 Omniana/Audio Arm 3 cassette magazine (A.R.P.H. 1982)
 L.A. Mantra 2 (Trance Port Tapes 1984)
 Neighborhood Rhythms  (Freeway/Rhino 1984)
 Re Records Quarterly vol. 2  (with James Grigsby) (Recommended 1989)
 Hollyword cassette (Freeway/Rhino 1990)

with Medicine (1990s and 2012-present version) 
Shot Forth Self Living (Def American/Warner Bros. 1992; Reissued with bonus material by Captured Tracks 2012)
The Buried Life (American Recordings/Warner Bros. 1993; Reissued with bonus material by Captured Tracks 2012)
Her Highness (American Recordings/Warner Bros. 1995)
 Medicine Box Set (Captured Tracks 2012)
 Always Starting To Stop (live cassette) (Captured Tracks 2012)
 To the Happy Few (Captured Tracks 2013)
 In Session (Captured Tracks 2014)
 Home Everywhere (Captured Tracks 2014)
 Medicine x Barcides (Bandcamp 2018)
 Scarred For Life (Drawing Room 2019)

Singles and EPs
"Aruca" (Creation 1992)
"5ive" (a.k.a. "Come Here To Drink Milk") (Creation 1993)
"Never Click" (Beggars Banquet, 1993)
"Sounds Of Medicine" (American 1994; Reissued with bonus material by Captured Tracks 2012)
"Time Baby 3" (Beggars Banquet, 1994)
"Off The Vine" (double 7") (Ectoplasm, 1995)
 Time Baby 2 (7") (Captured Tracks 2012)

Compilation appearances
The Crow OST (Atlantic, 1994)
The Doom Generation OST (American Recordings/Warner Bros., 1994)
Tigerbeat6 Inc. (Tigerbeat6, 2001)
 Musique Dessinee 01 - Just A Groove ! (Production Dessinee Japan 2006)

as Electric Company
 A Pert Cyclic Omen (Onion/American Recordings/Warner Bros., 1995)
 Electric Company Plays Amnesia (Supreme/Island/PolyGram, 1997)
 Studio City (Supreme/Island/PolyGram, 1998)
 Omakase (Vinyl Communications, 1999)
 Exitos (Tigerbeat6, 2000)
 Slow Food (Planet Mu, 2001)
 62-56 (Tigerbeat6, 2001)
 Greatest Hits (Tigerbeat6, 2001)
 It's Hard to Be a Baby (Tigerbeat6, 2003)
 Creative Playthings (Tigerbeat6, 2004)

EPs
 Live In Concept 10"+7" (Krown Pocket 1995)
 The Kahanek Incident (split w/ Furry Things) (Trance Syndicate 1997)
 New 3" CD (Fallt Invalid Object Series 2001)
 Greatest Hits Companion 1 (Tigerbeat6 2001)
 Greatest Hits Companion 2 (Tigerbeat6 2001)

Remixes & Compilation appearances 
 Slow Death in the Metronome Factory (World Domination, 1997)
 Dugga Dugga Dugga (WMO, 1998)
 Knots (Thousand, 1999)
 On-Soluble Words (Epic/SME, 1999)
 Sadovaja- A Sweet Design (Warner Bros. Sweden, 2000)
 Kid606 & Friends vol 1 (Tigerbeat6, 2000)
 American Breakbeat (Klangkreig, 2000)
 Kid606-P.S. You Love Me (Mille Plateaux, 2000)
 Cex - Oops I Did It Again (Tigerbeat6, 2001)
 Attitude (Tigerbeat6, 2000)
 The Cosmic Forces of Mu (Planet Mu, 2001)
 Tigerbeat6 Inc. (Tigerbeat6, 2001)
 Criminal 2 (Planet Mu, 2002)
 $ Vol.2 (Tigerbeat6, 2001)
 $ Vol.6 (Tigerbeat6, 2001)
 Marumari The Remixes (Carpark, 2002)
 45 Seconds Of (Simballrec, 2002 )
 Lowercase 2 (Bremsstrahlung, 2002)
 Ellen Allien- Weiss.mix (B Pitch Control, 2002)
 American Breakbeat : Rebuilt (Klangkreig, 2002)
 Wrong Application (Tigerbeat6, 2001)
 And The Beat Goes Off (Tigerbeat6, 2002)
 Paws Across America (Tigerbeat6, 2002)
 Good Night (Music To Sleep To) (Tigerbeat6, 2003)
 Stars As Eyes-Loud New Shit (Tigerbeat6, 2003)
 Open up and Say ...@+%_|^{!} (Tigerbeat6, 2003)
 O Superman Remix (Staalplaat, 2003)
 Audio Sponge 1 (Daisyworld Japan, 2003)
 Neighbors Remixing (Adjunct 2009)
 Solypsis -Hybrids (Component 2019)

as Amnesia
 Cherry Flavor Night Time (Supreme/Island/PolyGram, 1997)
 Lingus (Supreme/Island/PolyGram, 1998)
 Love Story / A Pretty Sight (7") (Krown Pocket, 1997)

as Personal Electronics
 The Story of Personal Electronics (LOHD, 1998)

Compilation appearance
 
 Blip,Bleep (soundtracks to imaginary videogames) (Lucky Kitchen, 1998)

with Vas Deferens Organization
Transcontinental Conspiracy (Quaquaversal Vinyl, 1996 - reissued on Niklas Records, 2011)
More Pelvis Wick for the Baloney Boners (Tekito, 1999)

with Kraig Grady
 Music From The Island of Anaphoria (Tiny Organ, 1998)

with Lusk
Free Mars (Volcano/BMG, 1997)

with Medicine (2002-04 BL duo with Shannon Lee version)
The Mechanical Forces of Love (Wall of Sound, 2003)
2.0 Extraneous (Drawing Room Records, 2017)

EPs
Wet on Wet (Wall of Sound, 2002)
I Smile To My Eyes (Wall of Sound, 2003)
As You Do (Wall of Sound, 2004)

Remixes & Compilation appearances 
The Faint - Danse Macabre Remixes (Astralwerks/Caroline/Virgin/EMI, 2003)
Themroc - Into the Light (Wall of Sound, 2003)
Wall of Sound 10th Anniversary (Wall of Sound, 2003)
Labels Series (EMI International, 2004)
Strictly Dub - Modern Dub Classics (Sunswept, 2005)

with North Valley Subconscious Orchestra
The Right Kind of Nothing (Ghostly International, 2006)

with The Internal Tulips
Mislead into a Field by a Deformed Deer (Planet Mu, 2010)
Mellotorn Offline (Bandcamp, 2012)
compilation appearance
 14 Tracks from Planet Mu (Planet Mu, 2011)

post 2000 solo releases as Brad Laner
The Subterranean River Caverns of Los Angeles (CD soundtrack for a book by Dani Tull- private edition, 2006)
Neighbor Singing (Hometapes, 2007)
Natural Selections (Hometapes, 2010)
Nearest Suns (Drawing Room/Hometapes, 2013)
Micro-Awakenings (online edition Mutant Sounds 2013; LP edition Drawing Room 2016)
Music For Beautiful Noise (Captured Tracks, 2014)
For Magnetic Tape (Drawing Room, 2015)
Elephant Heart Plumb (Midnight Circles, 2018)
Ligaments 01 - 05 (Captured Tracks, 2019)

Singles and EPs
Brad Laner / Joensuu 1685 split 12" (Splendour Norway 2010)
Highly Morning / Sideshow 7" (Drawing Room 2013)

Remixes & Compilation appearances 
Neighbors Remixing (Adjunct 2009)
Flossin-Serpents (Overlap 2009)
Triskaidekaphobia 13,000.00 MilliSeconds (Ratskin 2009)
I'll Be Hometapes For Christmas (Hometapes 2010)
Shedding - Tear In The Sun Reimagined (Bandcamp 2011)
The Neverending Beginning with Lauren Kinney (Hometapes 2011)
Another Iris - All Tiny Creatures (Hometapes 2012)

Brad Laner guest appearances on other artists' releases
Lindsey Buckingham - S/T (Reprise 2021)
The Flying Luttenbachers - Imminent Death (ugEXPLODE/God Records 2019)
Autumnfair - Watching The Sky (Thom Furhmann Records 2018)
Sissy Spacek - Expanding Antiverse (Dotsmark 2018)
Taleen Kali - Soul Songs (Lolipop 2018)
Mary Epworth - Elytral (Sunday Best 2017)
Vinyl Williams - Brunei (Company 2016)
Sissy Spacek - Duration Groups (Helicopter 2016)
D.D. Dobson - A Halo of Affectation (777 Was 666 2016)
Wild Nothing - Life of Pause (Captured Tracks 2016)
Tülips - Doom And Bloom (Lollipop 2015)
Digital Noise Academy - Synemy (Echo Field 2013)
M83 - Hurry Up, We're Dreaming (Mute 2011)
Blinker The Star - We Draw Lines (Nile River 2012)
The Caribbean - Discontinued Perfume (Hometapes 2011)
Lauren Kinney - Wail (Bandcamp 2013)
Lauren Kinney - Riddled (Bandcamp 2011)
Christopher Willits - Tiger Flower Circle Sun (Ghostly 2010)
Blinker The Star w/ Lindsey Buckingham - Catch And Release O.S.T. (Sony 2007)
Christopher Willits - Surf Boundaries (Ghostly 2006)
Vetiver - To Find Me Gone (DiChristina 2006)
Brian Eno - Another Day On Earth (Opal 2005)
Caribou - The Milk Of Human Kindness (Leaf 2005)
Caribou - Barnowl 12" (Leaf 2005)
Caribou - Marino DVD (Leaf 2005)
μ-ziq - Bilious Paths (Planet Mu, 2003)
Kid606 - Down With The Scene (Ipecac 2000)
Furry Things - Moments Away (Trance Syndicate 1999)
Blinker The Star - August Everywhere (DreamWorks 1999)
On - Shifting Skin (Epic 1999)
Spectacle -Glow In The Dark Soul (Supreme/Island 1998)
Ventilator - Reseda Spleen (Delmore 1997)
V3 - Photograph Burns (Onion/American 1996)
Eenie Meenie EP (Krown Pocket 1996)
Vas Deferens Organization - Saturation (Aether 1996)
Patio Collection vol. 2 (w/ Sweetcream USA) (Smilex 1997)
Solid Eye - Electromagnetic Field and Stream of Consciousness (Senseworks 1994)
The Black Watch - Amphetamines (Gotta Go 1994)
Motor Totemist Guild - Shapuno Zoo ( No Man's Land 1988)
Motor Totemist Guild - Homaggio a Futi (Auf Dem Nil 1988)
17 Pygmies- Welcome (Island 1988)
17 Pygmies- Missyfish (Nate Starkman and Sons 1991)
Fourwaycross - On The Other Hand (Nate Starkman and Sons 1989)
Fourwaycross - Pendulum (Independent Project Records 1993)
What Slender Young Leaders ! 7" (New Alliance 1986)
Blue Daisies - Wilt (Iridescence 1985)
Gary Kail / Zurich 1916 - Creative Nihilism (Iridescence 1984)
John Trubee - Beyond Eternity/Lavender Flesh (Cordelia 1984)

References

External links
 Official Web site
 Official profile on Hometapes record label Web site
 
 
 

1966 births
Living people
Musicians from Los Angeles
American Recordings (record label) artists
Island Records artists
Trance Syndicate artists
Planet Mu artists